Charlie McCarthy is Edgar Bergen's famed ventriloquist dummy partner. Charlie was part of Bergen's act as early as high school, and by 1930, was attired in his famous top hat, tuxedo, and monocle. The character was so well known that his popularity exceeded that of his performer, Bergen.

Charlie's personality was that of a mischievous little boy, who could wisecrack, misbehave, and flirt shamelessly in a way that Bergen couldn't. Bergen's original McCarthy dummy was built by noted carpenter/dummy-maker Theodore Mack, and was later rebuilt by Frank Marshall.

Charlie and Bergen made their radio debut on NBC's The Royal Gelatin Hour in 1936, where they proved such a hit that the following year the network gave them a starring role on The Chase and Sanborn Hour, where they were initially supported by emcee Don Ameche, singer Nelson Eddy, actress Dorothy Lamour, and comedian W. C. Fields. The following year, Charlie would be joined by a much dumber dummy, "Mortimer Snerd". After a famous mock feud with Fields on the program (during which Charlie often vowed to the comedian that he'd "mow him down"), the dummy soon became a true icon.

By 1939, Charlie was commanding 35.7% of the audience share  and was referenced by Barbara Stanwyck in 1945's hit comedy Christmas in Connecticut.

Though shortened to 30 minutes as The Chase and Sanborn Program, it wasn't until 1947, in a rare case of star taking precedent over sponsor in the title, that the series was officially renamed The Charlie McCarthy Show. After a year's hiatus while the duo toured the stage, 1949 brought a switch to CBS and change of sponsors to Coca-Cola. In 1955, Charlie and Bergen entered their last format, with the ventriloquist taking top billing for once, in The New Edgar Bergen Hour, which ran until 1956.

During this lengthy tenure, Charlie's guest roster was filled by many of the biggest stars of the day, including Henry Fonda, the Andrews Sisters, Rosemary Clooney, Roy Rogers, Frank Sinatra, Carol Channing, Groucho Marx, Dinah Shore,  Liberace, Bergen's wife Frances Bergen, and in occasional appearances, Charlie's "sister" Candice Bergen. Bergen and McCarthy also co-starred with Mickey Mouse in the 1947 Disney film Fun and Fancy Free. McCarthy also had a cameo in the 1938 Disney cartoon Mother Goose Goes Hollywood, tormenting W.C. Fields, who appeared as Humpty Dumpty.

In 1977, Charlie appeared with Bergen and Mortimer Snerd on Episode 207 of The Muppet Show. Fozzie's dummy "Chuckie" is based on Charlie.

Bergen and McCarthy made their final film appearance in The Muppet Movie, as guest judges of the Bogen County Fair beauty contest. Bergen died in 1978 shortly after filming this sequence, and the film is dedicated to his memory. Charlie is now on permanent display in the Smithsonian Institution.

Orson Welles
Charlie and Bergen were programmed opposite The Mercury Theatre on the Air on CBS, a program helmed by Orson Welles. On October 30, 1938, many listeners fiddled with the dial during Nelson Eddy's musical interlude, intending to switch back for Charlie's next comedy spot, and stumbled on Welles' production of The War of the Worlds, allegedly engendering a panic. As later reported, noted critic and wit Alexander Woollcott sent the young Welles a telegram on the subject: "This only goes to prove, my beamish boy, that the intelligent people were all listening to the dummy, and that all the dummies were listening to you." Ironically, by 1944, Orson Welles had become a recurring guest, with the dummy puncturing the pomposity of the genius.

Filmography
 1938: The Goldwyn Follies
 1938: Letter of Introduction
 1939: You Can't Cheat an Honest Man with Mortimer Snerd
 1939: Charlie McCarthy, Detective
 1941: Look Who's Laughing
 1942: Here We Go Again with Mortimer Snerd
 1943: Stage Door Canteen
 1944: Song of the Open Road
 1947: Fun and Fancy Free with Mortimer Snerd
 1950: Charlie's Haunt
 1970: The Phynx
 1979: The Muppet Movie
 2009: I'm No Dummy (archival footage)

References 

 Tollin, Anthony. Comedy from the Golden Age of Radio. Booklet for tape/CD set. Radio Spirits Inc., 1996.

External links
 

Ventriloquists' dummies
Puppets
Comedy franchises